Alexandersville, Ohio was a town located in Montgomery County, Ohio, United States just north of West Carrollton and south of Moraine.  It was incorporated into West Carrollton in 1943.

Alexandersville was platted in 1815. A post office called Alexandersville was established in 1828, and remained in operation until 1907.

References

External links
 West Carrollton Historical Society

Geography of Montgomery County, Ohio
Ghost towns in Ohio